The Alleycats are a Scottish collegiate a cappella group, hailing from the University of St Andrews, Scotland. The group was established in 2001. Since then, they have released nine albums, performing across the UK.

History

2001–09: Formation and early years 
The group was formed in 2001 by two students, Ben Murray and Dan Wright and soon grew with the addition of George Hollis, Matt King, Vince Wong, Nigel Mattinson, Bill Calderhead and David Caves. In the following years, the group set about increasing their reputation around the university, performing at several gigs around the university town.  Originally an all-male group, in 2007 girls were permitted to audition, and today the group consists of roughly half males and half females. They recorded four albums before 2008, the titles of which played on the feline name of the group : Their debut album, The Cat Pack; More Than A Feline; Cat Fight and Platinum Chat.

The group released their fifth studio album in 2008, entitled Meow, That's What I Call Music. That year, they applied to be on the BBC's primetime show, Last Choir Standing, where they progressed to the final 15. However, they were eliminated in Heat 1.

In March 2009, the group entered the inaugural Voice Festival UK competition at the semifinal stage, held in St Andrews. In the semifinal, they won the award for 'Outstanding Performance' for their mash-up of "Dance Wiv Me", "Lovestoned" and "Billie Jean", and progressed to the final in London.

That year, they also released their sixth studio album, Press Paws, which included tracks they had performed during Last Choir Standing.

2010: Cat Touch This and Edinburgh Fringe Debut 
In March 2010, the group competed in the Voice Festival for the second time and progressed to the final again, winning the award for 'Outstanding Performance' for their overall set in the final.

From 16 to 21 August of that year, the group debuted in the Edinburgh Fringe Festival 2010 and were given an official Sell-Out Show award.

2011: We're Not Kitten 
The group released an album titled We're Not Kitten, featuring some of the songs that had earned them success at the Edinburgh Fringe Festival in 2010. Featured on the album, their arrangement of 'Titanium' featuring Heather Robertson earned them the #2 spot in the UACUK (The UK University A Cappella Blog)'s "Best of British 2012". 
In the Voice Festival UK 2011 and 2012, the Alleycats were awarded "Outstanding Vocal Percussion", for Cammy Dobbie's performances, as well as "Outstanding Choreography" for Philip De Winter Shaw's work on "Till the World Ends / DJ Got us fallin' in love / Tonight".

The group performed at the Edinburgh Fringe Festival in 2013 for two weeks (31 July – 13 August) achieving 4-Star reviews.

2013: Furplay 
In November 2013, The Alleycats released their EP, Furplay, as a three track teaser for their album, released in 2014. The EP was recorded and produced by Liquid 5th, a studio based in the US.

2014: Careless Whisker 
In August 2014, The Alleycats released their album, Careless Whisker. The album was again recorded and produced by Liquid 5th, a studio based in the US.

2014: US Tour 
In January 2014, The Alleycats embarked on their first tour to the East coast of the US. For 10 days they traveled around Boston, New Haven, New York and New Jersey, visiting and singing with other university groups. They visited the Yale Spizzwinks, Tufts Sq!, The Boston College Bostonians, the MIT Chorallaries, the NYU Mixtapes and the Princeton Katzenjammers as well as performing at the Spence School in NYC.

2017: Scottish A Capella Championship 
In March 2017, the group successfully captured the title for the Scottish A Capella Championship with a set of "Dangerous Women / Crazy / Crazy in Love / Animal / Hey Now" against many other Scottish A Capella groups such as The Other Guys, The Accidentals, and 2016 Championship winner The Belles & The Beaus. In addition, Best Arrangement was awarded to Musical Director Lauren Gage, and special mention went to Caitlin Macdonald for her solo and to Joe Revell for his Vocal Percussion.

Current members
The members of the group can change every year as old students graduate and new students enroll. As of 2020, there are 11 members in the group, with Claire Beattie as Manager and Jamie Rees as Musical Director. Jamie Rees is also the vocal percussionist of the group.

Members in italics are new members of the year. Members with asterisk * left the group in the middle of the year.

2018

2019

Albums and EPs
 Careless Whisker (2014)
 Furplay (2013) 
 We're Not Kitten (2011)
 Cat Touch This (2010) 
 Press Paws (2009)
 Meow, That's What I Call Music (2008) 
 Platinum Chat
 Cat Fight
 More Than A Feline
 The Cat Pack

Reviews 
Three Weeks
UACUK
Broadway Baby
Edinburgh Fringe 'What's on'
Vocal Australia
Edinburgh Fringe Review (EFR)

See also
 List of collegiate a cappella groups in the UK

References

External links

A cappella musical groups
Clubs and societies of the University of St Andrews
Musical groups established in 2001
Scottish musical groups
2001 establishments in Scotland
University musical groups in the United Kingdom